Jennifer Manlove is an American sociological research scientist. She is a senior research scientist and co-director of the Reproductive Health and Family Formation program for the research institute Child Trends.

Education 
Manlove received a bachelor's degree in economics from Grinnell College and a master's in sociology from Duke University. In 1993 she received a PhD in Sociology from Duke University. From 1993 to 1995 she held a post-doctoral research fellowship at the National Center for Education Statistics funded by the American Educational Research Association.

Career 
Manlove is a senior research scientist and formerly director of the Reproductive Health and Family Formation program for the research institute Child Trends; as of 2021 she was co-director. She began working at Child Trends in 1995 as a research associate. 

Manlove's research interests include sexual and reproductive decision-making, fertility, and pregnancy among teenagers and young adults. She has been principal investigator for research grants from government agencies such as the National Institutes of Health to investigate the formation of relationships, effectiveness of pregnancy prevention programs, patterns of contraceptive use, effects of unintended pregnancy, and adjustment to fatherhood among young adults and teenagers. She has worked in association with Brookings Institution.

Selected publications 

 (Cited 483 times, according to Google Scholar  )  
 (Cited 206 times, according to Google Scholar. ) 
 (Cited 257 times, according to Google Scholar. )

References

External links 

Grinnell College alumni
Duke University alumni
American women sociologists
American sociologists
20th-century American women scientists
21st-century American women scientists
Year of birth missing (living people)
Living people